Hotel Impossible is a reality television program from Travel Channel in which struggling non-chain hotels receive an extensive makeover by veteran hotel operator and hospitality expert Anthony Melchiorri and his team. The show premiered on April 9, 2012, and ended on November 13, 2017. After airing seven seasons, the series launched a spin-off series called Hotel Impossible: Showdown in which four hoteliers of a pre-selected region that visit and judge each other's establishments for the highest ranking and a prize of $25,000. During season 8, another spin-off series called Hotel Impossible: Five Star Secrets began airing. In it, Melchiorri visits luxury resorts, learns what makes them special, and awards a $5,000 super tip to a deserving staff member. The show was not renewed for a new season in 2018 and is "no longer in active production".

Premise 
Each episode featured a particular hotel (always independent of a major chain or hotel system) struggling with problems and not living up to its full potential. Twenty-plus year veteran hotelier Anthony Melchiorri secretly scouts each hotel and identifies the property's most urgent issues. He meets with staff, including front desk clerks, housekeeping staff, the maintenance team, and the owners themselves, to determine the key operation failures. Some owners risk losing their hotels if Melchiorri's innovations don't work. After devising a plan for physical, cosmetic, and procedural changes with his designer (usually Casey Noble or former Design Star contestant Blanche Garcia), Melchiorri works to revamp the hotel and its usually biggest problem—the hotel owners themselves.

Hotel Impossible was renewed for a second season by the Travel Channel in September 2012. A special titled After Anthony aired on February 4, 2013, reviewing the hotels visited in the first season. The third season debuted on August 12, 2013. In January 2014, before the fourth season debuted, a series of six half-hour follow-up episodes titled Hotel Impossible Undercover revisited individual hotels from previous seasons. The fourth season debuted January 27, 2014, the fifth season on October 7, 2014.

Season 6 was broadcast in 2015, consisting of 13 episodes, one of which marked a return to Myrtle Beach, South Carolina.

Episodes

Series overview

Season 1 (2012)

Season 2 (2012–13)

Season 3 (2013)

Hotel Impossible Undercover (2014)

Season 4 (2014)

Season 5 (2014–15)

Season 6 (2015)

Season 7 (2016)

Season 8 (2016–17)

See also

 Hotel Hell
 The Hotel Inspector

References

External links
 
 

2012 American television series debuts
2017 American television series endings
2010s American reality television series
Travel Channel original programming
Television series set in hotels